Amy's Ride is a series of non competitive bicycle rides held in various states of Australia, by the Amy Gillett Foundation, in the memory of Amy Gillett who died in a road accident in Germany. Money raised is spent on efforts to reduce the incidence of motorist/cyclist road accidents.

The 2007 event around Geelong and the Bellarine Peninsula in Victoria, attracted 2700 riders and consisted of three options:
 Road route around the Bellarine Peninsula
 Bellarine Peninsula rail trail route
 Circuits of the Geelong Botanic Gardens in Eastern Park, Geelong

See also

Cycling in Victoria

References 

Cycling in Victoria (Australia)
Sport in Geelong
Cycling events in Victoria